The Northern Ireland national under-21 football team also known as the Northern Ireland under-21s or Northern Ireland U21s, is the national under-21 football team of Northern Ireland and is controlled by the Irish Football Association. The team competes in the UEFA European Under-21 Football Championship, held every two years. To date Northern Ireland haven't yet qualified for the finals tournament.

The national under-21 team is the highest level of youth football in Northern Ireland, and is open to any players who were born in Northern Ireland or whose parents or grandparents were born in Northern Ireland. This team is for Northern Irish players aged 21 or under at the start of a two-year European Under-21 Football Championship campaign, so players can be, and often are, up to 23 years old. As long as they are eligible, players can play at any level, making it possible to play for the U21s, senior side and again for the U21s.

Competitive Record
For the all-time record of the national team against opposing nations, see the team's all-time record page

UEFA European Under-21 Championship Record

Results and fixtures

2021

2022

2023 UEFA European Under-21 Football Championship

Group stage

Players

Current squad
Players born on or after 1 January 2000 will be eligible until the completion of the 2023 UEFA European Under-21 Championship.

The following players were named in the squad for two friendly internationals against  on the 22 & 25 September 2022.

Caps and goals updated as of 25 September 2022 after the match against . Names in bold denote players who have been capped for the senior team.

Recent call-ups
The following players have previously been called up to the Northern Ireland under-21 squad in the last year and remain eligible.

COVID = Player withdrew due to a positive COVID test or from being in close contact with someone with a positive COVID test.
INJ = Player withdrew from the squad before any games had been played.
PRE = Preliminary squad / standby.
SEN = Player withdrew from the squad due to a call up to the senior team.
SUS = Suspended from national team.
WTD = Withdrew due to other reasons.

Player records

Top appearances 

Caps and goals updated as of 25 September 2022 after the match against .

Top goalscorers 

Caps and goals updated as of 25 September 2022 after the match against .

Under-21 graduates
Players who have won 25 or more Northern Ireland 'Full' caps after playing for Northern Ireland U21.

 Full caps and goals updated as of 12 October 2021 after the Northern Ireland senior team match against .

Managers

Last updated after the match against  on 25 September 2022.

 * first two games as caretaker manager
 ** caretaker manager for all 7 games

See also

 Northern Ireland national football team
 Northern Ireland national under-17 football team
 Northern Ireland national under-19 football team

References

External links

 NI U21 Appearance Details from NIFG

Under 21s
Northern Ireland national under-21 football team
European national under-21 association football teams
Youth association football in Northern Ireland